The Heart Thief is a 1927 American silent romantic drama film directed by Nils Olaf Chrisander and starring Joseph Schildkraut, Lya De Putti, and Robert Edeson.

Cast
 Joseph Schildkraut as Paul Kurt  
 Lya De Putti as Anna Gallambos  
 Robert Edeson as Count Franz Cserhati  
 Charles K. Gerrard as Count Lazlos  
 Eulalie Jensen as Countess Lazlos  
 George Reehm as Galambos  
 William Bakewell as Victor

References

Bibliography
 Bock, Hans-Michael & Bergfelder, Tim. The Concise CineGraph. Encyclopedia of German Cinema. Berghahn Books, 2009.

External links

1927 films
American romantic drama films
1927 romantic drama films
Films directed by Nils Olaf Chrisander
American silent feature films
American black-and-white films
Producers Distributing Corporation films
1920s English-language films
1920s American films
Silent romantic drama films
Silent American drama films